Ryan Cook may refer to:

 Ryan Cook (American football) (born 1983), who plays for the Dallas Cowboys
 Ryan Cook (Australian rules footballer) (born 1988), who played for the Collingwood Magpies
 Ryan Cook (baseball) (born 1987), Nippon Professional Baseball player
 Ryan Cook (musician) (born 1981), country music artist
 Ryan Dallas Cook (1982–2005), former trombone player in the ska band Suburban Legends